Katghara is a village in the Deoria district in the state of Uttar Pradesh, India.

Geography 
Katghara falls under the Bhatpar Rani block. It has its own gram panchayat.

Demographics 
As of the 2001 Indian census, Kathaghara had a population of 1,221. Males constitute 47% of the population and females 53%.

Cities, towns, and neighborhoods 
The nearest place for shopping is Aktahi. The nearest town is Bhatpar Rani.

Schools 
Katghara village has primary school funded by the state government. It also has a privately owned middle school (up to class 10). There are schools in Bahiyari and Sohanpur for 10+2. The only option for graduation is Madan Mohan Malviya University situated at Bhatpar Rani.

References 

http://www.maavooru.org/Place.aspx?PID=588067

Villages in Deoria district